USS Bivin (DE-536) was a John C. Butler-class destroyer escort in service with the United States Navy from 1944 to 1947. She was finally sunk as a target in 1969.

History
Bivin was named after Vernard Eugene Bivin who was killed during the Battle of Cape Esperance and awarded the Navy Cross posthumously for his brave actions. USS Bivin (DE-536) was launched 7 December 1943 by Boston Navy Yard; sponsored by Mrs. Ella Florence Bivin, mother of Seaman Bivin; and commissioned 31 October 1944.

Pacific War 
Assigned to the U.S. Pacific Fleet, Bivin departed Boston, Massachusetts, 1 February 1945 and arrived at Seeadler Harbor, Manus, Admiralty Islands, 20 March. After escorting a convoy from Kossol Roads, Palau Islands, to Leyte during late March and early April, she patrolled and escorted convoys in the Philippines. Between late August and early November she escorted convoys from the Philippines to Okinawa, patrolled in the Philippines, and made a trip to Hong Kong.

Decommissioning and fate 
Returning to San Pedro, California, 17 December 1945 she reported to the 19th Fleet. On 15 January 1947 she went out of commission in reserve. On 30 June 1968 she was struck from the Navy list, and, on 17 July 1969, sunk as target off California.

References

External links 

 NavSource Online: Destroyer Escort Photo Archive - USS Bivin (DE-536)

John C. Butler-class destroyer escorts
World War II frigates and destroyer escorts of the United States
Ships built in Boston
1943 ships